Peking is a steel-hulled four-masted barque. A so-called Flying P-Liner of the German company F. Laeisz, it was one of the last generation of cargo-carrying iron-hulled sailing ships used in the nitrate trade and wheat trade around Cape Horn.

History

Nitrate trade
Peking was launched in February 1911 and left Hamburg for her maiden voyage to Valparaiso in May of the same year. After the outbreak of World War I she was interned at Valparaiso and remained in Chile for the duration of the war. Awarded to the Kingdom of Italy as war reparations, she was sold back to her original owners, the Laeisz brothers, in January 1923. She remained in the nitrate trade until traffic through the Panama Canal proved quicker and more economical.

Arethusa II 
In 1932, she was sold for £6,250 to Shaftesbury Homes. She was first towed to Greenhithe, renamed Arethusa II and moored alongside the existing Arethusa I. In July 1933, she was moved to a new permanent mooring off Upnor on the River Medway, where she served as a children's home and training school. She was officially "opened" by Prince George on 25 July 1933. During World War II she served in the Royal Navy as HMS Pekin. In 1964 she portrayed HMS Battledore in the movie Murder Ahoy .

Museum ship in New York
Arethusa II was retired in 1974 and sold to Jack Aron as Peking, for the South Street Seaport Museum in New York City, where she remained for the next four decades. However, the Seaport NYC did not see Peking as part of its long-term operational plans, and was planning to send the vessel to the scrap yard. A 2012 offer to return the ship to Hamburg, where she was originally built, as a gift from the city of New York, was contingent upon raising an endowment in Germany to ensure the preservation of the vessel.

Return to Germany
In November 2015 the Maritim Foundation purchased the ship for US$100. Peking is intended to become part of the German Port Museum (Deutsches Hafenmuseum) at Schuppen 52 in Hamburg for which €120 million of federal funds would be provided. She was taken to Caddell Drydock, Staten Island, on 7 September 2016, to spend the winter. On 14 July 2017 she was loaded on the deck of the semi-submersible heavy-lift ship  for transport across the Atlantic, at a cost of some €1 million, arriving at Brunsbüttel on 30 July 2017.

Refurbishment in Germany
On 2 August 2017 she was transferred to Peters Werft, located at Wewelsfleth, for a three-year refurbishment at a cost of €38 million. The restoration included review of rigging, double floor steel plates, dismounting and remount of all masts, docking in dry dock, renewal of the steel structure, removal of the cement that filled the lower  of the hull, painting, woodwork and overall refurbishment. The ship twice spent about two years in dry dock. Peking was refloated on 7 September 2018 with a primer-painted hull. Teak was reinstalled on deck. The ship was transferred on 7 September 2020 to the German Port Museum.

See also
Around Cape Horn in the Peking, by Captain Irving Johnson, 1929 
"Ralph McTell" song about Peking, "Around the Wild Cape Horn" from his album, Somewhere Down the Road
"Tom Lewis (songwriter)" song Peking, from his album, Mixed Cargo
Unique among them in having been motorised.
  – lost 1957 in the Atlantic
  – museum ship in Germany, and sister ship to Peking
  – museum ship in Finland
 Other preserved barques
 
  – museum ship in Glasgow
 
 
 
 
 
  – the last wooden barque in original configuration

References 
Notes

Bibliography
Johnson, Irving. Round the Horn in a Square Rigger (Milton Bradley, 1932) (reprinted as The Peking Battles Cape Horn (Sea History Press, 1977 )
Johnson, Irving. Around Cape Horn (film) (Mystic Seaport, 1985) (from original 16 mm footage shot by Irving Johnson, 1929)

External links 
The History of Shaftesbury Homes and the Arethusa, giving details of the purchase of the Pekin/Peking

Barques
Windjammers
Individual sailing vessels
Tall ships of Germany
Four-masted ships
Ships built in Hamburg
Merchant ships of Germany
1911 ships
Training ships of the United Kingdom
Museum ships in New York (state)
Museum ships in Germany
Also see YouTube video titled "Around Cape Horn (1929)"